The North Harbour International (also known as North Shore City International) is an open international badminton tournament in New Zealand. This was the first international tournament hosted by North Harbour, North Shore, Auckland. This tournament organized by Badminton North Harbour with sanctioned by Badminton Oceania and Badminton World Federation.

Previous results

Performances by nation

See also 
 New Zealand Open
 Auckland International
 Waikato International

References

External link 
 Badminton North Harbour

Badminton tournaments in New Zealand
2001 establishments in New Zealand
Recurring sporting events established in 2001